Filleul is a French surname. Notable people with the surname include:

Adelaide Filleul, Marquise de Souza-Botelho (1761–1836), French writer
Clara Filleul (1822–1878), French painter and author
Don Filleul (1926–2016), Jersey politician
Nicolas Filleul de La Chesnaye (1530–1575), French poet
Philip Filleul (1885–1974), English rower
Rosalie Filleul (1752–1794), French pastellist and painter

See also
Jeanne Filleul-Brohy (1867–1937), French croquet player

French-language surnames